The 2015 St. Edmundsbury Borough Council election took place on 7 May 2015 to elect members of the St. Edmundsbury Borough Council in England. It was held on the same day as other local elections.

Results summary

Ward results

Abbeygate

Bardwell

Barningham

Barrow

Cavendish

Chedburgh

Clare

Eastgate

Fornham

Great Barton

Haverhill East

Haverhill North

Haverhill South

Haverhill West

Horringer & Whelnetham

Hundon

Ixworth

Kedington

Minden

Moreton Hall

Northgate

Pakenham

Risby

Risbygate

Rougham

Southgate

St Olaves

Stanton

Westgate

Wickhambrook

Withersfield

References

2015 English local elections
May 2015 events in the United Kingdom
2015
2010s in Suffolk